Ha may refer to:

Agencies and organizations
 Health authority
 Hells Angels Motorcycle Club
 Highways Agency (renamed Highways England, now National Highways), UK government body maintaining England's major roads 
 Homelessness Australia, peak body organisation for homeless people and services
 Homosexuals Anonymous an ex-gay program for dealing with unwanted same-sex attractions
 Hong Kong Housing Authority

Arts, entertainment, and media 
 Ha (Doseone album), 2005
 Ha (Talvin Singh album), 2002
 Ha! (Killing Joke album), 1982
 "Ha" (song), by Juvenile
 Ha! (TV channel), an American all-comedy TV channel
 Hamar Arbeiderblad, a Norwegian newspaper
 Human Action, a book by the Austrian economist Ludwig von Mises
 The Jim Henson Company, formerly known as ha!

Language
 Ha (Javanese) (ꦲ), a letter in the Javanese script
 Ha (kana), in syllabic Japanese script
ه (hāʾ), ح (ḥāʾ), or خ (ḫāʾ), Arabic letters
 Ha language, the language of the Ha people in eastern Africa
 Hausa language, ISO 639-1 code HA

Places
 Ha, Bhutan
 Hå, Norway
 Ha Gorge, Greece
 HA postcode area, a group of English postal districts in north-west London
 Henan, a province of China (Guobiao abbreviation HA)

Science and technology

Chemistry
 Hahnium, an element now called Dubnium
 Hyaluronan (Hyaluronic acid), a carbohydrate structure
 Hydroxylapatite, a mineral

Medicine
 Hyperandrogenic anovulation, also called polycystic ovary syndrome
 Health anxiety (HA) or hypochondriasis (hypochondria)
 Hemagglutinin (influenza) (HA), an antigenic glycoprotein from Influenza viruses
 Hemagglutination assay, a measurement of viruses or bacteria

Units of measure
 Hartree, an atomic unit of energy
 Hectare (ha), a unit of area
 Hectoampere, a unit of electric current

Other uses in science and technology
 ha (function prefix) (half), a prefix for some trigonometric functions in mathematics
 High availability, systems design and implementation with a view to maximising service
 Hour angle, in astronomy, one of the coordinates of the equatorial coordinate system
 Ha, or alternative hypothesis, in statistical testing

Surnames
Ha (Chinese surname) (哈), found in the Hundred Family Surnames
Ha (Korean surname) (하, 河 or 夏)
Hà, Vietnamese surname
Hạ, Vietnamese surname
Xia (surname) (夏), romanized as Ha in Cantonese, Korean and Vietnamese pronunciation

Transportation
 British Rail Class 71, a locomotive (classified type HA under the Southern Region's pre-TOPS scheme)
 Hawaiian Airlines (IATA designator HA)
 Highways Agency (now National Highways), UK government body maintaining England's major roads

Other uses
 Ha (mythology)
 Ha, one of deities Heng and Ha
 Ha people, a Tanzanian people
 Hospitalman Apprentice, a U.S. Navy rank

See also 
 Haa (disambiguation)
 Haha (disambiguation)
 Has (disambiguation)